The 2007 Men's Universiade Water Polo Tournament was the 22nd edition of the event at the Summer Universiade. The tournament was held from Friday August 10 to Friday August 17, 2007.

Preliminary round

GROUP A

GROUP B

GROUP C

GROUP D

Second round

GROUP E

Play-Offs

Finals
11th place

9th place

7th place

5th place

Bronze Medal Match

Gold Medal Match

Final ranking

Individual awards
Most Valuable Player

Best Goalkeeper

Best Scorer

References
 Results

2007 Summer Universiade
U
2007
2007